Mount Gilliland, is a  mountain in the Solitude Range of the Hart Ranges in Northern British Columbia.

Named for Canadian Army Battery Quartermaster Sergeant Norman Walter Gilliland, originally from Bowden, Alberta but enlisted at Dawson Creek, British Columbia; serving with 3 Light Anti-Aircraft Regiment, Royal Regiment of Canadian Artillery, attached to the 2nd Canadian Infantry Division when he died 29 September 1944, age 44. He is buried in Wijnegem Communal Cemetery, Belgium.

References 

One-thousanders of British Columbia
Canadian Army soldiers
Dawson Creek
Canadian Rockies
Peace River Land District